Big Lakes County, formerly the Municipal District of Big Lakes, is a municipal district in north-central Alberta, Canada.

It is located in Census Division 17, around the Lesser Slave Lake. Utikuma Lake and Winagami Lake are also located in the municipality.

History 
Big Lakes County was previously known as the Municipal District of Big Lakes prior to March 6, 2015.

Geography

Communities and localities 
The following urban municipalities are surrounded by Big Lakes County.
Cities
none
Towns
High Prairie
Swan Hills
Villages
none
Summer villages
none

The following hamlets are located within Big Lakes County.
Hamlets
Enilda
Faust
Grouard or Grouard Mission
Joussard
Kinuso

The following Métis settlements and Indian reserves are located within Big Lakes County.

Métis settlements
East Prairie Métis Settlement
Gift Lake Métis Settlement
Peavine Métis Settlement

Indian reserves
Drift Pile River
Kapawe'no Freeman
Halcro and Pakashan
Sucker Creek
Swan River

The following localities are located within Big Lakes County.
Localities

Aggie
Banana Belt
Big Prairie
Gilwood
Heart River
Heart River Settlement
Improvement District No. 17
Kenzie

Leicester
Lesser Slave Lake Settlement
Nine Mile Point
Prairie Echo
Salt Prairie
Salt Prairie Settlement
Triangle

Demographics 

As a census subdivision in the 2016 Census of Population conducted by Statistics Canada, Big Lakes County had a population of 5,672 living in 2,099 of its 2,728 total private dwellings, a  change from its 2011 population of 5,912. This includes the populations of three Métis settlements, East Prairie (304), Gift Lake (658) and Peavine (607), located within the census subdivision that are municipalities independent of Big Lakes County.

Big Lakes County's 2013 municipal census counted a population of 3,861, a  change from its 2002 municipal census population of 4,181.

Visible minorities and Aboriginals 
Big Lakes had the most Métis people per capita of any Canadian census subdivision in 2006 with a population of 5,000 or more due to the census' inclusion of the population of the three Métis settlement municipalities within Big Lakes' totals.

Education
Southeastern parts of the district are within Pembina Hills Public Schools, which formed in 1995 as a merger of three school districts.

See also 
List of communities in Alberta
List of municipal districts in Alberta

References

External links 

 
Big Lakes